7α-Hydroxydehydroepiandrosterone (7α-hydroxy-DHEA; 7α-OH-DHEA), also known as 3β,7α-dihydroxyandrost-5-ene-17-one, is an endogenous, naturally occurring steroid and a major metabolite of dehydroepiandrosterone (DHEA) that is formed by CYP7B1 (steroid 7α-hydroxylase) in tissues such as the prostate gland and by CYP3A4 in the liver. The major metabolic pathway of DHEA outside the liver is via 7-hydroxylation into 7α-OH-DHEA and 7β-OH-DHEA. 7α-OH-DHEA has weak estrogenic activity, selectively activating the estrogen receptor ERβ. In addition, 7α-OH-DHEA may be responsible for the known antiglucocorticoid effects of DHEA.

Serum levels of 7α-OH-DHEA have been found to be significantly elevated in patients with Alzheimer's disease. It is unclear what significance this may have, if any.

7α-OH-DHEA is on the World Anti-Doping Agency list of prohibited substances in sporting.

See also
 7-Keto-DHEA
 7α-Hydroxyepiandrosterone
 7β-Hydroxyepiandrosterone

References

External links
 

Diols
Androstanes
Antiglucocorticoids
Estrogens
Ketones
World Anti-Doping Agency prohibited substances